Daphne Fitzpatrick (born 1964) is an artist based in Williamsburg, Brooklyn.

Fitzpatrick was born in Long Island.  Their work encompasses sculpture, video, photography and a variety of found objects and images.  They reference the idea of a modern flaneur in their work, and makes visual puns on sexuality.

Fitzpatrick was a member of the faculty at Yale.  They were also one of the founders of Bellwether Gallery, by which they were later represented. They are currently represented by American Contemporary Gallery in New York, NY.

Solo Exhibition History
2012
 Whistle and Flute, American Contemporary, New York, NY

Group Exhibition History
2013
 Objectified: Sculpture Today, Saatchi Gallery, London, UK

2012
 Whistle and Flute, American Contemporary, New York, NY
 It is what it is. Or is it?, curated by Dean Daderko, Contemporary Arts Museum Houston, TX
 Photography Sculpture Figure, M + B, Los Angeles, CA

2010
 All Dogs Allowed, Museum 52, New York, NY 
 Seat-Of-The-Pants, Museum 52, New York
 this is a performance, Artist Curated Projects (ACP), Los Angeles, CA, curated by Sam Gordon
 NOBODY GETS TO SEE THE WIZARD. NOBODY. NOT NOHOW., Anna Kustera Gallery, New York, NY, curated by Doug McClemont
 Food for Thought, curated by Sabrina Buell, Jessica Silverman Gallery, San Francisco, CA

2009
 A Trip Down (False) Memory Lane, The Lexington Club, San Francisco, CA
 DiSoRgAnIzEd, Museum 52, New York, NY, curated by Jacob Robichaux

2008
 Jekyll Island, Honor Fraser Gallery, Los Angeles, CA
 Funny Not Funny, Bellwether, New York, NY
 Duck Soup, La MaMa Galleria, New York, NY, curated by Daphne Fitzpatrick

2007
 A Roll In The Hay, Bellwether Gallery, New York, New York
 Shared Women, Los Angeles Contemporary Exhibitions (LACE), Los Angeles, California
 Future 86, Parksville, New York City, New York

2006
 Ridykeulous, Participant Inc., New York, New York

2005
 Part Three: Last Minute, 47 Orchard, New York, New York

2004
 neoqueer, Center of Contemporary Art, Seattle, Washington

2003
 Little Triggers, Cohan and Leslie, New York, New York

2000
 To Be Continued..., Art in General, New York, New York

References

External links
Daphne Fitzpatrick at American Contemporary
Daphne Fitzpatrick at Bellwether Gallery
Information on the Shared Women exhibition
Further information, texts and imagery from the Saatchi Gallery
Daphne Fitzpatrick on ArtFacts.net

Living people
1964 births
Yale University faculty
People from Williamsburg, Brooklyn